Rafia Obaid Ghubash is a Dubai psychiatrist and epidemiologist who serves as president of the Arab Network for Women in Science and Technology, and is a former president of the Arabian Gulf University. She is known as a role model of women's empowerment.

Education and career
Ghubash earned a PhD in Epidemiological Psychiatry from London University in 1992, becoming an assistant professor of psychiatry at UAE University School of Medicine, then newly opened, in Al Ain. She is a practicing psychiatrist.

She was president of the Arabian Gulf University in Bahrain during 2000-2009. She is president of the Arab Network for Women in Science and Technology, an organization to both help women scientists attain leadership positions and attract more women into science.

Dr. Rafia takes a strong interest in the education of Arab women, receiving an award for Middle East Women's Educational Achievement in 2002. In 2012, she opened Women’s Museum Dubai to display and honour the achievements of women in the UAE in various fields.

Ghubash was nominated to become a councilor for the World Future Council and became a council member in 2006.

In 2012, she founded The Women’s Museum, Bait al Banat (House of Women, in English) in her childhood home in Dubai.

Dr. Rafia Ghobash served as a judge for the Arab Women Award in 2017.

Awards 

 The Hamdan Award for individuals working in the field of medicine and health - 2003-2004.
 Middle East Women's Achievements - Education Award - offered by Datamatics Foundation - 2002
 Khalaf Ahmad Al Habtoor Lifetime Achievement Award - 2014
 Inspirational Arab Woman of the Year - 2015

Books 

 Alive after leaving "حضر بعد رحيله": a biography about her late brother Dr. Hussein Ghobash - published by Kalemat Kuwait
 A Woman before her time "امرأة سبقت عصرها": a book about the late poet Ousha Bint Hussein Lootah - self published
 Encyclopedia of an Emirati Woman "موسوعة المرأة الإماراتية": co-authored with Mariam Sultan Lootah in 2018 - published by The Women's Museum

References

External links
 Gulf University, Bahrain

Bahraini women academics
Living people
Academic staff of the Arabian Gulf University
Cairo University alumni
Alumni of the University of London
Academic staff of United Arab Emirates University
Year of birth missing (living people)
Women in the United Arab Emirates
Emirati women poets
Emirati women writers